Touch the Sky is a 1983 album by American singer Smokey Robinson. It was produced and arranged by Robinson with Reginald "Sonny" Burke, and recorded and mixed at Golden Sound Studios, Inc., Hollywood, California. The album was released on the Motown sub-label Tamla.

Reception

The album peaked at #50 on Billboard pop charts, and at #8 on R&B charts.

There were two singles released from this album. "I've Made Love to You A Thousand Times" peaked at #101 Billboard and #8 R&B charts, "Touch The Sky" at #110 Billboard and #68 R&B charts.

William Ruhlmann rated the album with 2 out of 5 stars on AllMusic. Robert Christgau rated the album as B+, giving a special recommendation to "cheating-song fans".

Track listing

Side A
"Touch the Sky" (William "Smokey" Robinson) - 5:45
"Gimme What You Want" (Marvin Tarplin, William "Smokey" Robinson) - 4:00
"Even Tho'" (Forest Hairston) - 3:47
"Gone Again" (William "Smokey" Robinson) - 3:40

Side B
"All My Life's a Lie" (William "Smokey" Robinson) - 3:58
"Sad Time" (Scott D. Getlin, Stephen D. Tavani) - 4:21
"Dynamite" (Berry Gordy, William "Smokey" Robinson) - 4:37
"I've Made Love to You A Thousand Times" (Marvin Tarplin, William "Smokey" Robinson) - 5:38

Personnel

Fellow Miracles members Claudette Robinson, then Smokey's wife, joins for background vocals on the title track, Marv Tarplin is featured on rhythm guitar and songwriting. Also featured are Robinson regulars Fred Smith and Michael Jacobsen (since A Quiet Storm – 1975), and Sonny Burke (since Smokey's Family Robinson – 1976). On "Dynamite" Robinson shares songwriting-credits with Berry Gordy, founder of Motown records (besides everything else).

Smokey Robinson - lead vocals
Brenda L. Eager, Claudette Robinson, Ivory Davis, James Sledge, James Gadson, Leon Ware, Patricia Henley, Smokey Robinson - backing vocals
Reginald "Sonny" Burke -  keyboards, synthesizers 
Michael Boddicker, Paul Fox - synthesizer programming
Marvin Tarplin, Charles J. Fearing, David T. Walker, Paul Jackson, Jr. - guitar
Scott Edwards, Nathan East, James Jamerson, Jr. - bass
James Gadson, Reginald "Sonny" Burke - drums
Paulinho da Costa - percussion
Ernie Watts - flute, saxophone 
Fred Smith - flute
Charles Berghofer, David Schwartz, Gareth Nuttycombe, Michael Jacobsen - strings
Harry Bluestone - concertmaster
George Annis - music contractor

Production
 Produced and Arranged by William "Smokey" Robinson, Jr. and Reginald "Sonny" Burke.
 Recording Engineer – Paul Ring
 Technical Engineer – Robert Biles
 Assistant Engineer – Gary Jaye
 Mixing – Gary Jaye, Paul Ring, William "Smokey" Robinson, Jr., and  Reginald "Sonny" Burke.
 Mastered by Wally Traugott at Capitol Records, Hollywood, California.
 Album Coordinator – Randy Dunlap
 Art Direction – Johnny Lee and Terry Taylor
 Cover Photography – David Alexander and Sheri Hyatt
 Photomontage – Sarah Sakakibara
 Cover Design – Alana Coghlan

References

External links
Touch the Sky on Discogs

Smokey Robinson albums
1983 albums
Motown albums